Peter Wong (July 8, 1931 – June 6, 1998) was a Canadian politician, who served as mayor of Sudbury, Ontario from 1982 to 1991, and chair of the Regional Municipality of Sudbury from 1997 until his death the following year.

Early life
Born in Moose Jaw, Saskatchewan and raised in the village of Radville, Wong studied civil engineering at the University of Denver, graduating in 1954. He worked for Ontario's Department of Highways, and spent two years working on infrastructure projects in Thailand, before taking a job with Sudbury's municipal public works department. By the early 1980s he had been promoted to the city's senior engineer, as well as serving as a trustee on the Rainbow District School Board.

Wong was also an avid curler, and played second for the Northern Ontario team at the 1973 Macdonald Brier, on a team skipped by Don Harry. The rink went 3-7 at the event.

Wong and his wife Lynn had two children.

Mayoralty

After losing his job with the city in a round of austerity measures incumbent mayor Maurice Lamoureux had implemented in early 1982, Wong successfully challenged Lamoureux for the mayoralty in that year's municipal election. He was the city's first non-white mayor, as well as the first Chinese Canadian mayor of a major Canadian city and only the third Chinese Canadian mayor ever elected in any municipality.

His term as mayor was marked by efforts to diversify the city's mining-based economy, as well as expansion of the city's extensive environmental remediation programs. Notable projects taking place during his term included the creation of Science North, an interactive science museum which launched in 1984, and the city's hosting of the 1988 World Junior Championships in Athletics. He also launched Action Sudbury, a municipal awareness campaign to combat drinking and driving, in 1984.

In 1989, Peter and Lynn Wong attended a parade in Sudbury, Massachusetts as special guests on the occasion of that town's 350th anniversary.

In the 1991 municipal elections, former mayor Jim Gordon sought a return to office, and Wong was defeated.

He subsequently served on several municipal and provincial boards and commissions, including as a vice-chair of the Ontario Highway Transport Board and as chair of the Northern Ontario Heritage Fund, as a chair of the local United Way, and as a board member of the Sudbury Regional Hospital.

Regional chair

In the 1997 municipal elections, the provincial government reformed the structure of the regional municipality, making the position of regional council chair a generally elected position for the first time. The position had previously been filled by a vote within council. Wong stood as a candidate and won over challenger Frank Mazzuca, becoming the municipality's first elected regional chair.

After serving less than a year in that office, Wong died of a heart attack on June 6, 1998 while attending a meeting of the Federation of Canadian Municipalities in Regina. On June 8, tributes to Wong were delivered in the Legislative Assembly of Ontario by Rick Bartolucci and Shelley Martel, and on June 10, a tribute was delivered in the House of Commons by Ray Bonin.

Mazzuca, Wong's challenger in the 1997 election, won the by-election following Wong's death, and was the final chair of the regional municipality before its amalgamation into the current city of Greater Sudbury.

References

1931 births
1998 deaths
Mayors of Sudbury, Ontario
Canadian politicians of Chinese descent
Curlers from Northern Ontario
Curlers from Saskatchewan
Canadian sportsperson-politicians
People from Moose Jaw
Ontario school board trustees
People from Radville, Saskatchewan